Sir Robert Stewart Crawford  (27 August 1913 - 11 October 2002, Oxfordshire), known as Stewart Crawford, was a British diplomat.

Background
Crawford was the son of Sir William Crawford, founder of the advertising agency W. S. Crawford Ltd.

Education
After five years at Gresham's School, Holt, Norfolk, he spent a term at University of Tübingen before going up to Oriel College, Oxford, where he took a First in Philosophy, Politics, and Economics.

Career
1936: Joined the Air Ministry as a civil servant
1940-1946: Private Secretary to the Chief of Air Staff
1946-1947: Assistant Secretary, Control Office for Germany and Austria
1954-1956: Counsellor, British Embassy, Norway
1957-1959: Counsellor, later Minister, British Embassy, Baghdad
1959-1960: Deputy UK Delegate to Organization for European Economic Co-operation
1961-1965: Assistant Under Secretary, Foreign Office
1966-1970: UK Political Resident, Persian Gulf
1970-1973: Deputy Under-Secretary of State, Foreign and Commonwealth Office
1973-1974: Chairman, Committee on Broadcasting Coverage
1976-1984: Member of BBC General Advisory Council

Family
Crawford married Mary Katharine Corbett, daughter of Eric Corbett. They had four sons and one daughter.

Honours
Companion of the Order of St Michael and St George, 1951
Commander, Royal Victorian Order, 1955
Knight Commander of the Order of St Michael and St George, 1966
Knight Grand Cross of the Order of St Michael and St George, 1973

References
Who's Who 2003 (A. & C. Black, London, 2003) page 489
Obituary: Sir Stewart Crawford by Denis Wright in The Independent, 1 November 2002

External links
Telegraph obituary

1913 births
2002 deaths
Alumni of Oriel College, Oxford
People educated at Gresham's School
Knights Grand Cross of the Order of St Michael and St George
Commanders of the Royal Victorian Order
Chairs of the Joint Intelligence Committee (United Kingdom)
Members of HM Diplomatic Service
Civil servants in the Air Ministry
British colonial political officers
Private secretaries in the British Civil Service
20th-century British diplomats